Matthias Preusser (born 29 October 1976, Mödling) is an Austrian oncologist and Professor of Medical Oncology as well as Head of the Clinical Division of Oncology at the Medical University of Vienna. He is known for his work on neurooncology, Molecular Therapy targets and biomarkers and immunotherapy of cancer.

Biography 
Preusser studied medicine at the Medical University of Vienna, received his Medical Doctor (M.D.) degree in 2003 and holds specialist diplomas for internal medicine, hematology and medical oncology. He achieved habilitation in the field of Experimental Oncology 2009 with the thesis Analysis of Biomarkers in Brain Tumours and in the field of Internal Medicine 2016 with the thesis Personalized Therapy of Cancer. From 2009 he spent stays abroad at the German Cancer Research Center, Heidelberg and at the Memorial Sloan-Kettering Cancer Center, New York. On October 1, 2018 Preusser was appointed as full Professor of Medical Oncology and on November 1, 2018 as Head of the Clinical Division of Oncology at the Medical University of Vienna. He also serves as coordinator of the brain tumor unit of the Comprehensive Cancer Center – Central Nervous System (CCC-CNS).

Scientific contributions 
Preusser's scientific work deals with the identification of molecular changes with prognostic and therapeutic relevance in brain tumors. His investigations on the significance of the MGMT gene (O-6-methylguanine-DNA methyltransferase), the IDH gene (glioblastoma multiforme) and the BRAF gene and the immunophenotype inlcuing the role of PD-L1 in gliomas and brain metastases are highly cited and he is co-author of the current WHO brain tumor classification, which is considered an international standard reference. The oncologist leads several international clinical studies including a randomised therapy trial on high grade meningioma.

Academic memberships 
 European Society of Medical Oncology ESMO
 European Organisation for Research and Treatment of Cancer (EORTC)
 European Association of Neurooncology (EANO)
 Society of Austrian Neurooncology (SANO) (cofounder and first secretary)
 Österreichische Gesellschaft für Hämatologie und Medizinische Onkologie (ÖGHO)
 Central European Cooperative Oncology Group (CECOG)

Honors and awards 
 2008 Medical University of Vienna Researcher of the month
 2009 Cardinal-Innitzer-Price (advancement award)
 2009 Sibylle Assmus Price for Neuro-Oncology, Heidelberg
 2011 EANO Fellowship Grant
 2010 und 2013 Advancement award of the city of Vienna

Publications 
Publication list PubMed

References

External links 
 ESMO 2012 Kongress. Melanoma. Matthias Preusser, Comprehensivce Cancer Center Medical University of Vienna
 Matthias Preusser

Austrian oncologists
21st-century Austrian physicians
1976 births
Living people